Henry Halfdan Valen (20 May 1924 – 27 January 2007) was a Norwegian political scientist.

He was born in Hadsel. He was appointed Professor at the University of Oslo from 1970. His main research interest has been electorate behavior. He chaired the Norwegian Social Science Data Services from 1974 to 1980. He was decorated Knight, First Class of the Order of St. Olav in 1998.

His daughter Guro Valen was a professor of medicine.

References

1924 births
2007 deaths
People from Hadsel
Academic staff of the University of Oslo
20th-century Norwegian male writers
21st-century Norwegian male writers
20th-century Norwegian educators
21st-century Norwegian educators